Oymyakon is a rural locality (a selo) in Oymyakonsky District of the Sakha Republic, Russia, located in the Yana-Oymyakon Highlands, along the Indigirka River,  northwest of Tomtor on the Kolyma Highway. By winter average temperatures, it is the coldest permanently inhabited settlement on Earth.

Etymology
It is named after the Oymyakon River, whose name reportedly comes from the Even word kheium, meaning "unfrozen patch of water; place where fish spend the winter". However, another source states that the Even word heyum (hэjум, хэюм; kheium may be a misspelling), which means "frozen lake", may be where it gets its name.

Geography
Oymyakon has two main valleys beside it. These valleys trap wind inside the town and create a colder climate. The temperatures here are extremely cold for most of the year, and it snows frequently in spring and autumn, but rarely in summer and winter, due to the Siberian High in winter and temperatures are commonly above  in summer.

History
During World War II, an airfield was built in the district of Aeroport, for the Alaska-Siberian (ALSIB) air route, used to ferry American Lend-Lease aircraft to the Eastern Front.

Oymyakon is located near the historic Road of Bones.

Over the last few decades, the population of Oymyakon has shrunk significantly. The village had a peak population of roughly 2,500 inhabitants, but that number has dwindled to fewer than 900 in 2018.

The local economy is mostly fur trading and ice fishing.

Climate

The weather station is in a valley between Oymyakon and Tomtor. The ground is permanently frozen (continuous permafrost).

This was shown on the Australian program 60 Minutes in a 2012 documentary. This was almost the coldest officially recorded temperature in the Northern Hemisphere (Verkhoyansk had recorded  on 5 and 7 February, 1892). Only Antarctica and Greenland have recorded lower official temperatures (the lowest being , recorded at Vostok Station on 21 July 1983). The unofficial record cold temperature is roughly 8°C warmer than the sublimation point of carbon dioxide.  

During some years the temperature drops below  in late September and remains below freezing until mid-April. Oymyakon has never recorded an above-freezing temperature between 26 October and 16 March inclusive. Sometimes summer months can also be quite chilly, but in June, July and August the temperature has never dropped below , while in June and July, the temperature has never dropped below . Oymyakon and Verkhoyansk are the only two permanently inhabited places in the world that have recorded temperatures below  for every day in January.
By the contrast July is the month where every day has had temperature above  . In contrast, 4 January has the lowest record high at 

Although winters in Oymyakon are long and extremely cold, summers are mild to warm, sometimes hot, with cool to cold summer nights.

The climate is quite dry, but as average monthly temperatures are below freezing for seven months of the year, substantial evaporation occurs only in summer months. Summers are much wetter than winters. Due to its harsh winters, the plant hardiness zone in Oymyakon is between 1a and 1b.

See also

 Summit Camp
 Oymyakon Plateau

Notes

References

Videos

External links

City map Oymyakon

Rural localities in Oymyakonsky District
Weather extremes of Earth